The 2006 MAAC men's basketball tournament was held March 3–6 at Pepsi Arena in Albany, New York.

Second-seeded  defeated  in the championship game, 80–61, to win their seventh MAAC men's basketball tournament.

The Gaels received an automatic bid to the 2006 NCAA tournament.

Format
All ten of the conference's members participated in the tournament field. They were seeded based on regular season conference records.

As the regular-season champion, top seed  received a bye to the semifinals.

Bracket

References

MAAC men's basketball tournament
2006 in sports in New York (state)
Basketball competitions in Albany, New York
College basketball tournaments in New York (state)